Jean-Pierre Ouellet (born August 21, 1946 in Saint-Éleuthère, Kamouraska County, Quebec) is a Canadian politician in the province of New Brunswick.

He is a three-term member of the Legislative Assembly of New Brunswick representing the riding of Madawaska-les-Lacs for the Progressive Conservative Party.  He was a member of Premier Richard Hatfield's cabinet.

He served as Minister of Youth from 1974 to 1982 and as Minister of Education from 1985 to his defeat in the 1987 election which saw the Liberals take power.

Ouellet returned to politics as the Conservative Party of Canada candidate in the riding of Madawaska-Restigouche in the 2006 federal election but was defeated by incumbent Jean-Claude D'Amours in a close race.

References

1946 births
Acadian people
Conservative Party of Canada candidates for the Canadian House of Commons
French Quebecers
Members of the Executive Council of New Brunswick
Progressive Conservative Party of New Brunswick MLAs
People from Madawaska County, New Brunswick
Université de Moncton alumni
People from Bas-Saint-Laurent
Living people